Nailsworth is a suburb four km north of Adelaide, South Australia. The suburb borders Sefton Park, Prospect, Broadview, Medindie Gardens and Collinswood. The North Road Cemetery is located within the suburb and was founded by Bishop Augustus Short in 1853.  It contains the graves of some prominent South Australians.

Government
Nailsworth is located in the City of Prospect local government area.

History
Nailsworth was the location of the first post office of Prospect from 1861 to about 1872. The post office was located at First avenue (First Street, 1860–1901). Two tall palm trees were planted in front of the post office, so that people could see the location of the office from a distance.

References

Suburbs of Adelaide